Noorul Huda Shah (born in Hyderabad, Sindh on 22 July 1951) is a Pakistani dramatist, short story writer, poet and columnist. She was also the Information Minister during the caretaker government in Sindh. Shah writes in both Sindhi and Urdu. She is best known for writing popular TV serials like Jungle, Marvi, Faaslay and Tapish.

Career
Noorul Huda completed her education from Sindh University and then started a career at Pakistan Television Corporation (PTV). Her first play, Jungle, aired on television in 1983. Later, she joined Geo as a soap producer and then became a script writer for Hum TV. She was appointed as CEO of A-Plus television. Afterwards, she started working for Hum Sitaray. In 2017, she joined Bol Network. Shah has written numerous short stories, some of which have been compiled in a collection called Jala Watan. Presently, Shah writes a column for an online news forum called HumSub.

List of TV dramas
 Jungle
 Asmaan Tak Deewar
 Tapish
 Marvi (Sindhi)
 Marvi
 Ab Mera Intazaar Kar
 Zara Si Aurat
 Ajnabi Raaste
 Thodi Si Mohabbat
 Bebak
 Hawa Ki Beti
 Na Junoon Raha Na Pari Rahi
 Meri Adhuri Moahabat
 Ajayb Ghar
 Ishq Gumshuda
 Badlon Pay Basera
 Aman aur Pichu
 Chand Khatoot Chand Tasveerein
 Sammi
Adhoora Milan
Faaslay

Awards 

 President's Award for Pride of Performance (2008)

References

External links

Living people
Sindhi people
Sindhi-language writers
Pakistani women writers
Pakistani dramatists and playwrights
Pakistani novelists
Pakistani screenwriters
University of Sindh alumni
Provincial ministers of Sindh
Women provincial ministers of Sindh
People from Hyderabad, Sindh
Sindhi female writers
1951 births